Sunkara Venkata Adinarayana Rao (born 30 June 1939) is an Indian orthopaedic surgeon noted for his work for the poor and needy. He received India's fourth-highest civilian award Padma Shri by the government of India in 2022.

Early life and career 
Rao was born in Bhimavaram, West Godavari District, Andhra Pradesh, India to Kanakam and Seshamma. He is married to R. Sashiprabha, former superintendent of the King George Hospital. His brother Sunkara Balaparameswara Rao is a neurosurgeon.

He attended U.L.C.M. High School. He completed his M.B.B.S. degree in 1966 and in 1970, Master's degree in Orthopaedic Surgery from Andhra Medical College, Visakhapatnam.

Awards 
In 1988, Rao was awarded the National Award by the Prime Minister of India for his welfare works for the disabled. He is also a recipient of the Madras Telugu Academy Award, and the National Award of the Mahaveer Foundation. In 2014, he received the National Award for Child Welfare from the President of India. In 2022, he received Padma Shri.

References

1939 births
Living people
People from West Godavari district
Indian orthopedic surgeons
Medical doctors from Andhra Pradesh
20th-century Indian medical doctors
20th-century surgeons
Recipients of the Padma Shri in medicine